Kokei may refer to:
 Kōkei (monk) (c. 977 – 1049), Japanese Buddhist monk
 Kōkei (sculptor) (fl. 1175 – 1200), Japanese sculptor